Events in the year 2021 in Brazil.

Incumbents

Federal government 
President: Jair Bolsonaro
Vice President: Hamilton Mourão

Governors
 Acre: Gladson Cameli
 Alagoas: Renan Filho
 Amapa: Waldez Góes
 Amazonas: Wilson Lima
 Bahia: Rui Costa
 Ceará: Camilo Santana
 Espírito Santo: Renato Casagrande
 Goiás: Ronaldo Caiado
 Maranhão: Flávio Dino
 Mato Grosso: Mauro Mendes
 Mato Grosso do Sul: Reinaldo Azambuja
 Minas Gerais: Romeu Zema
 Pará: Helder Barbalho
 Paraíba: João Azevêdo
 Paraná: Ratinho Júnior
 Pernambuco: Paulo Câmara
 Piauí: Wellington Dias
 Rio de Janeiro: Wilson Witzel (until 30 April); Cláudio Castro (starting 30 April)
 Rio Grande do Norte: Fátima Bezerra
 Rio Grande do Sul: Eduardo Leite
 Rondônia: Marcos Rocha
 Roraima: Antonio Denarium
 Santa Catarina: Carlos Moisés
 São Paulo: João Doria
 Sergipe: Belivaldo Chagas
 Tocantins: Mauro Carlesse

Vice governors
 Acre: Wherles Fernandes da Rocha
 Alagoas: José Luciano Barbosa da Silva
 Amapá: Jaime Domingues Nunes
 Amazonas: Carlos Alberto Souza de Almeida Filho
 Bahia: João Leão
 Ceará: Maria Izolda Cela de Arruda Coelho
 Espírito Santo: Jacqueline Moraes da Silva
 Goiás: Lincoln Graziane Pereira da Rocha
 Maranhão: Carlos Orleans Brandão Júnior
 Mato Grosso: Otaviano Olavo Pivetta
 Mato Grosso do Sul: Murilo Zauith
 Minas Gerais: Paulo Brant
 Pará: Lúcio Dutra Vale (until 26 April); vacant thereafter
 Paraíba: Lígia Feliciano
 Paraná: Darci Piana
 Pernambuco: Luciana Barbosa de Oliveira Santos
 Piaui: Regina Sousa
 Rio de Janeiro: Cláudio Castro (until 30 April), vacant (starting 30 April)
 Rio Grande do Norte: Antenor Roberto
 Rio Grande do Sul: Ranolfo Vieira Júnior
 Rondônia: José Atílio Salazar Martins
 Roraima: Frutuoso Lins Cavalcante Neto
 Santa Catarina: Daniela Cristina Reinehr
 São Paulo: Rodrigo Garcia
 Sergipe: Eliane Aquino Custódio
 Tocantins: Wanderlei Barbosa Castro

Events

January and February 
January 12 – Ford Motor Company announces it is closing three plants and laying off 5,000 workers.
January 21 – Tendencias Consultoria, a consultant company focused on the economy, warns of food shortages in isolated areas, particularly in the favelas and quilombos, as the government ends emergency aid.
January 24
A plane crashes in Palmas, Tocantins, killing four Palmas Futebol e Regatas footballers, their squad's president, and the pilot.
January 26 – The Supreme Federal Court approves an investigation into the government's handling of the pandemic in Manaus.
January 28 – Four hundred religious leaders, including Catholics, Anglicans, Lutherans, Presbyterians, and Methodists, demand the impeachment of President Bolsonaro for mismanagement of the pandemic. There are another 60 such demands pending in the Chamber of Deputies.
February 1 – Operation Car Wash ends with 174 convictions in Brazil, 12 current or former presidents implicated across Latin America, and $790 million returned to Brazil's public coffers, with nearly $2.8 billion more on the way.
February 4 – Vale S.A. agrees to pay 37.7 billion reais ($7.03 billion) to settle the January 2019 Brumadinho dam disaster in which 270 people died.
February 10 – The traditional Carnival in Rio de Janeiro is canceled with strict warnings against clandestine celebrations.
February 19
President Bolsonaro prevents a truckers′ strike by agreeing to a two-month delay on federal tariffs on diesel fuel.
The last male member of the Juma people dies of COVID-19.
February 20 – Three videos broadcast by Telemundo show elderly people in Petrópolis and Niterói, Rio de Janeiro State, being injected by empty syringes rather than with COVID-19 vaccine.
February 22 – Stock prices of Petrobras fall 21% as investors worry that the appointment of General Joaquim Silva e Luna as head of the company means economic decisions will be made based on politics.
February 25 – The Health Minister admits he mistakenly sent 76,000 doses of COVID-19 vaccine destined for Amazonas state (population 4,000,000) to Amapá municipality (population 9,000).
February 26 – The death toll in the COVID-19 pandemic surpasses 250,000, second-highest in the world.

March and April
March 2 – The number of COVID-19 deaths in a single day reaches a new high of 1,641.
March 4 – The World Bank and the International Monetary Fund (IMF) estimate that the Brazilian economy shrank by 4.1% in 2020, less than original estimates of 8%-9%, but the worst performance in decades.
March 8
A child named Henry Borel is murdered in Barra da Tijuca, inside the apartment of his mother Monique Medeiros and his stepfather, councilor and doctor Jairo Souza (better known as Dr. Jairinho); who are both suspected of having caused his death.
Edson Fachin, a judge from the Brazilian Supreme Court, nullifies the condemnations of former president Luiz Inácio Lula da Silva, 75, (2003-2010), restoring his civil rights and making it possible for him to run for president in 2022.
March 10 – The number of COVID-19 deaths in a single day reaches a new high of 2,349.
March 15
The Ministry of Health confirms the purchase of 138 million doses of the Sputnik, Pfizer and Janssen vaccines by the end of the year to combat COVID-19.
President Jair Bolsonaro changes health minister for the fourth time, cardiologist Marcelo Queiroga replaces Eduardo Pazuello in office.
March 15-30 — São Paulo suspends all religious and sporting activities as the health services are overwhelmed.
March 16 — A new record of 24-hour COVID-19 deaths was recorded in the country, 2,340.
March 23
Brazil records 3,251 deaths from COVID-19 in 24 hours, a new record.
Marcelo Queiroga becomes the fourth Health Minister in the last year.
March 24 — Brazil surpasses the mark of 300,000 deaths caused by the COVID-19 pandemic.
March 26
Brazil once again breaks its own record and records 3,600 deaths from COVID-19 in 24 hours.
In an interview with Der Spiegel, former president Lula calls the COVID-19 pandemic the “biggest genocide” in Brazil's history.
March 29
Six ministers are relieved of their jobs, including Foreign Relations (Ernesto Araújo), Defense (Fernando Azevedo e Silva), Gobierno (André Mendonça), Chief of Staff (Walter Souza Braga Netto), and Justice (José Levi do Amaral), according to the Minter of Communications.
According to reports from O Globo and Folha de S.Paulo, military commanders Edson Leal Pujol (army), Ilques Barbosa Junior (navy), and (Antonio Carlos Muaretti Bermúdez (air force) met to discuss their possible resignations.
April 1 – Grupo Globo announces sale of the Som Livre label to Sony Music Entertainment for US 255 million.
April 27 – The COVID-19's CPI (Comissão Parlamentar de Inquérito) was installed in the Federal Senate, with the objective of investigating alleged omissions and irregularities in the Brazilian federal government's expenditures during the COVID-19 pandemic in Brazil.
April 29 – Brazil reaches the mark of 400,000 deaths from COVID-19.
April 30 – The impeachment of the governor of the state of Rio de Janeiro Wilson Witzel is approved, the politician will be ineligible for 5 years.

May and June
May 4 – An 18-year-old man armed with a knife and a dagger invades a daycare center in the municipality of Saudades (SC) and kills three children and two teachers.
May 6 – Operation against drug trafficking by the Civil Police leaves 29 dead and 2 injured in the Jacarezinho neighborhood, in Rio de Janeiro.
May 28 – The Ministry of Health authorizes vaccination against COVID-19 in people over the age of 18 across the country.
May 29 – Protests against the Jair Bolsonaro government take place in various parts of the country, there was also a record of a protest by Brazilian citizens in Paris.
May 31 – CONMEBOL announces that the 2021 Copa America will be hosted in Brazil.
June 9 – Protests break out in Lins de Vasconcelos after Afro-Brazilian influencer Kathlen Romeu is killed by a stray bullet in a police shootout.
June 11 
Deforestation in Brazil Amazon rainforest increases by 67%. President Bolsonaro has not followed through on his April pledge to boost funding for environmental enforcement.
During the 2021 United Nations Security Council Elections, Brazil is elected to a two-year term as a non-permanent member of the UN Security Council, starting in 2022. It will mark the eleventh time Brazil has sat on the Security Council.

July to December 
August 12 - Lower House of the Brazilian Congress voted to expel fellow lawmakers Flordelis de Souza following murder charges against her in the 2019 murder case of Anderson do Carmo.
December 1 - André Mendonça becomes the first Evangelical Christian positioned to join the top court, after his Mendonça's appointment for the Supreme Court was approved by the Senate on 1 December 2021 in a voting of 47-32.
November 5 - 2021 Piedade de Caratinga Beechcraft King Air crash
December 26 - Late December 2021 Bahia floods

Culture

January
January 1 - The musical duo Anavitória releases their fourth studio album, Cor.
January 7
Premiere of the movie Um Tio Quase Perfeito 2 in theaters.
Debut of the TV show Zeca Pelo Brasil on Rede Bandeirantes.
January 8 - Because of the COVID-19 pandemic, the governor of Ceará, Camilo Santana, cancels Carnival across the state.
January 11 - Disney Latin America decides to cancel all programs of Fox Sports channels in Brazil, the programming grid is now composed only of live or replayed sporting events.
January 15 - Premiere of the movie Double Dad on Netflix.
January 17 – The first season of the reality show The Voice + begins on Globo.
January 19 – Debut of Gênesis telenovela on RecordTV.
January 20 - Debut of the TV show A Noite É Nossa on RecordTV.
January 21 - The City of Rio de Janeiro cancels the carnival that, due to the pandemic of COVID-19, would take place in July 2021.
January 22
The singer Raí Saia Rodada releases his new album Som no Talo.
Premiere of the game show Nickelodeon Além do Filtro at Nickelodeon.
January 25
 467th anniversary of São Paulo.
 The twenty-first season of the popular reality show Big Brother Brasil begins on Globo.
January 29
Selena Gomez launches the video for the song Baila Conmigo, recorded on a beach in the municipality of Icapuí, Ceará, and directed by the Brazilian Fernando Nogari.
Globo postpones the telenovela Nos Tempos do Imperador again and announces a replay of The Life We Lead to replace it.

February
February 5 - Premiere of the TV series Invisible City on Netflix.
February 8 - Premiere of the fifth season of the TV show Conversa com Bial on Globo.
February 12 - The City of São Paulo decides to cancel the Carnival due to the pandemic of COVID-19.
February 13-14 - Because of the cancellation of the carnival, Globo shows the special Desfile Nº 1 Brahma, replaying each day 14 parades of samba schools anthological of the carnival of São Paulo and of the carnival of Rio de Janeiro.
February 19 - The singer Thiaguinho releases his new album Infinito 2021, Vol. 1.
February 20 - Debut of the reality show Bake Off Celebridades on SBT.
February 23 - Premiere of the documentary Pelé on Netflix.
February 25 - Premiere of the film Depois a Louca Sou Eu in theaters.

March
March 1 - 456th anniversary of Rio de Janeiro.
March 4
The worsening of the pandemic of COVID-19 causes the ninth edition of the music festival Rock in Rio to be postponed to 2022.
Premiere of the film Lucicreide Vai Pra Marte in theaters.
Globo postpones the telenovela Um Lugar ao Sol again and announces a replay of Empire to replace it.
March 5 - Premiere of the TV program Dani-se on GNT.
March 8
Globo shows the TV special Falas Femininas.
Premiere of the TV series Filhas de Eva on Globoplay.
March 12 - DJ Bruno Martini releases his debut album, Original.
March 13 - Rapper Djonga releases his fourth studio album, Nu.
March 15 - The final episode of the telenovela A Mother's Love is shown on Globo.
March 18 - Premiere of the movie Get the Goat on Netflix.
March 22 - Premiere of the TV program Vem Pra Cá at SBT.
March 23 - With the worsening of the COVID-19 pandemic in the country, Globo once again interrupts the production of its dramaturgical works at Estúdios Globo.
March 24
Premiere of the talk show Posso Explicar at National Geographic.
TV Cultura shows the TV special Nicette em 3 Atos, in honor of actress Nicette Bruno.
March 30 — Premiere of the third season of the reality Pesadelo na Cozinha at Bandeirantes.

April
April 1 – The label Som Livre is sold to Sony Music Entertainment.
April 15 – At the Latin America Music Awards, Anitta wins in the Favorite Artist - Female category.
April 19 – Globo shows the TV special Falas da Terra.
April 24 – Premiere of the reality show Mestres da Sabotagem at SBT.
April 25 – Premiere of the third season from the reality show Canta Comigo on RecordTV.
April 27 – Second season premiere of the TV show Minha Receita at Bandeirantes.
April 28
Launch of Te Amo Lá Fora, second studio album by singer Duda Beat.
Lollapalooza Brazil is postponed again to the days March 25, 26 and 27, 2022.
Premiere of the film Os Salafrários on Netflix.
April 29 – Premiere of the documentary about the singer and former Big Brother Brasil participant Karol Conká, A Vida Depois do Tombo on Globoplay.

May
May 4
Premiere of the TV series Onde Está Meu Coração on Globoplay.
Globo changes the night program schedule and re-displays 220 Volts Especial de Fim de Ano in honor of comedian Paulo Gustavo, who died of complications from COVID-19 that same night.
With 90.15% of the votes, makeup artist and lawyer Juliette Freire is the winner of the 21st edition of the popular reality show Big Brother Brasil.
May 8 — Globo shows the TV special BBB - Dia 101.
May 9 — Premiere of the fifth season of the reality show Power Couple Brasil on RecordTV.
May 11
Multishow broadcasts live the seventh day mass in memory of actor Paulo Gustavo, held at Cristo Redentor, in Rio de Janeiro.
Premiere of the fifth season of the reality show No Limite on Globo.
May 13
Rádio Itatiaia is sold to businessman Rubens Menin.
Premiere of O Caso Evandro, documentary about the murder of the boy Evandro, on Globoplay.
May 17 — The telenovela Salve-se Quem Puder is shown again on Globo.
May 19 – As a result of the COVID-19 pandemic, Globo postpones the premiere of the telenovela Quanto Mais Vida Melhor.
May 20 — Launch of Passado & Presente, posthumous album by singer MC Kevin.
May 24 — Because of the postponement of Quanto Mais Vida Melhor, Globo announces a repeat of the telenovela The Big Catch.

Sports

March 9 – The Rio de Janeiro state legislature votes to change the name of Maracanã Stadium (officially ″Estádio Jornalista Mário Filho″) to ″Edson Arantes do Nascimento – Estádio Rei Pelé″ (Rei is ″king″ in English), pending approval by the governor.

Deaths

January
January 1 – Cleonâncio Fonseca, 84, politician, Deputy (1987–2007).
January 2 – Cléber Eduardo Arado, 48, footballer (Kyoto Purple Sanga, Coritiba); COVID-19.
January 5
Bonifácio José Tamm de Andrada, 90, professor, lawyer and politician, Deputy (1979–2019), complications from COVID-19.
Brandãozinho, 90, footballer.
January 7 – Genival Lacerda, 89, forró singer; COVID-19.
January 10 – Stanley Gusman, 49, television presenter; COVID-19.
January 13
Eusébio Scheid, 88, Roman Catholic cardinal, Archbishop of Roman Catholic Archdiocese of São Sebastião do Rio de Janeiro (2001–2009); COVID-19.
Maguito Vilela, 71, mayor (Movimento Democrático Brasileiro) of Goiânia, Goiás; lung failure related to COVID-19. 
January 16 – Mauro Telles, 80, politician, mayor of Ibaté (1977–1978, 1979–1982, 1989–1992).
January 19 – José Alves, 86, footballer (Botafogo, Corinthians, América).
January 24 – Brazilians who died in the 2021 Tocantinense aviation disaster:
Marcus Molinari, 23, footballer (Tupi, Ipatinga, Tupynambás).
Lucas Meira, 32, football executive, president of Palmas Futebol e Regatas.
Guilherme Noé, 28, footballer (Batatais, Rio Preto, Ipatinga).
Lucas Praxedes, 23, footballer.
Ranule, 27, footballer (Atlético Itapemirim, Democrata, Resende).
January 29 – Roberto Fernando Frojuelo, 83, footballer (São Paulo, River Plate, Colo-Colo).

February
February 2 – Vera Nunes, 92, actress.
February 3 – Nilson Borges, 79, footballer (Portuguesa-SP, Atlético Paranaense).
February 6
Zezinho Corrêa, 69, singer.
Afonso Fioreze, 78, Coadjutor Bishop (2003–2004) and Bishop (2004–2017) of Roman Catholic Diocese of Luziânia.
February 9
Marilena Ansaldi, 86, dancer, choreographer and actress (Selva de Pedra, Éramos Seis).
Ivan Izquierdo, 83, Argentine-born Brazilian neurobiologist; COVID-19.
José Maranhão, 87, politician, Deputy (1983–1994), Senator (2003–2009, since 2015) and Governor of Paraíba (1995–2002, 2009–2011); COVID-19.
February 19 – Amoim Aruká, 86, warrior, last male member of the Juma people; COVID-19
February 20 – Niana Machado, actress.
February 22 – Laurindo Guizzardi, 86, Bishop of Roman Catholic Diocese of Bagé (1982–2001) and Roman Catholic Diocese of Foz do Iguaçu (2001–2010).
February 25 – Berta Zemel, 86, actress.

March
March 3
Sérgio Eduardo Castriani, 66, archbishop of Roman Catholic Archdiocese of Manaus (2012–2019); sepsis.
Ruy Scarpino, 59, football manager (Imperatriz, Ceará, Ituano); COVID-19.
March 5 – José Carlos da Silva Júnior, 94, businessman and politician, Senate of Brazil (1996–1999) and vice-governor of Paraíba (1983–1986); COVID-19.
March 7
Fabio Brunelli, 51, news anchor, journalist and writer; cancer.
Kleber Lopes, 39, humorist (A Praça é Nossa); COVID-19.
March 9
Léo Rosa, 37, actor (Vidas Opostas); testicular cancer.
Adhemar Santillo, 81, politician, deputy (1975–1986) and mayor of Anápolis (1986–1989, 1997–2001); pulmonary embolism from COVID-19.
March 10 – Hélio Fernandes, 100, journalist.
March 11 – Mauro Aparecido dos Santos, 66, archbishop of Roman Catholic Archdiocese of Cascavel (since 2007); COVID-19.
March 12 – Ademar Frederico Duwe, 82, politician, Santa Catarina MLA (1987–1991).
March 13 
Silvio Favero, 54, politician and lawyer, Mato Grosso MLA (since 2019); COVID-19.
Terezinha Morango, 84, model, Miss Brasil (1957).
March 14 – Silvio Antonio Favero, 54, politician from Mato Grosso do Sul; COVID-19.
March 16 – Gilmar Fubá, 45, footballer (Corinthians); bone marrow cancer.
March 17 – Helenês Cândido, 86, politician and lawyer, governor of Goiás (1998–1999); COVID-19.
March 18
Herzem Gusmão Pereira, 72, politician and journalist, mayor of Vitória da Conquista (since 2017) and Bahia MLA (2015–2016); COVID-19.
Major Olímpio, 58, politician, senator (since 2019), deputy (2015–2019) and São Paulo MLA (2007–2015); COVID-19.
March 19 – Irmão Lázaro, 54, councilman, gospel singer and former member of Olodum; COVID-19.
March 21 – Edson Montenegro (Cidade de Deus, Cúmplices de um Resgate), 63, actor; COVID-19.
March 24
Aécio de Borba, 89, politician, deputy (1983–1995, 1997–1998) and member of the Constituent Assembly; cardiac arrest.
Haroldo Lima, 81, politician and anti-dictatorship activist, general director of the ANP (2005–2011) and deputy (1983–2003); COVID-19.
March 27
Odirlei Pessoni, 38, Olympic bobsledder (2014, 2018); traffic collision.
Paulo Stein, 73, journalist and sports announcer; COVID-19.
March 29 – Pedro Tanaka, 23, surfer; drowned.
March 30 – Contardo Calligaris, 72, psychoanalyst, writer and columnist for the newspaper Folha de S. Paulo; Cancer.
March 31 – Carlos Pedro Zilli, 66, Brazilian-born Bissau-Guinean Roman Catholic prelate, bishop of Roman Catholic Diocese of Bafatá (since 2001); COVID-19.

April

April 1
João Acaiabe (Sítio do Pica-Pau Amarelo, Chiquititas), 76, actor; COVID-19.
Maria de Lourdes Beserra, 93, politician.
April 2 – Jean Luc Rosat, 67, Olympic volleyball player (1976, 1980), complications from COVID-19.
April 3
José Adauto Bezerra, 94, former governor of the state of Ceará (1975-1978); COVID-19.
Paulo Medina, 78, judge, justice of the Superior Court of Justice (2001–2010); COVID-19.
Agnaldo Timóteo, 84, singer, composer and politician; COVID-19.
April 5 – Robert de Almendra Freitas, 73, doctor and politician, mayor of José de Freitas (2005–2010) and Piauí MLA (1987–2003); COVID-19.
April 6 – Firmino Filho, 57, economist and academic, mayor of Teresina (1997–2004, 2013–2020) and Piauí MLA (2011–2012).
April 7 – Alfredo Bosi, 84, literary critic, member of the Brazilian Academy of Letters; COVID-19.
April 8 – Roseli Machado, 52, Olympic long-distance runner (1996); COVID-19.
April 9
Abdul Hamid Sebba, 86, lawyer and politician, Goiás MLA (1995–2003); COVID-19.
Rubens Recalcatti, 72, politician and lawyer.
April 10 – Ângela Bettencourt, 69, librarian.
April 19 – Dedim Gouveia, 61, forró singer; COVID-19.
April 20 – Ana Lúcia Menezes, 46, actress, voice actor (Alice in Wonderland, Pretty Little Liars) and dubbing director; Stroke.
April 23 – Levy Fidelix, 69, politician, founder and president of PRTB (Partido Renovador Trabalhista Brasileiro); COVID-19.
April 27 — Iara Riça, 56, actress and voice actor (The Powerpuff Girls, X-Men: Evolution); aneurysm.

May

May 4 – Paulo Gustavo (Vai Que Cola, Minha Mãe é uma Peça), 42, actor and comedian; COVID-19.
May 7 – Cassiano, 77, singer and composer; COVID-19.
May 15 – Eva Wilma (Mulheres de Areia, A Indomada), 87, actress; Cancer.
May 16 – Bruno Covas, 41, mayor of São Paulo; Cancer.
May 17 – MC Kevin, 23, singer.
May 23 — Paulo Mendes da Rocha, 92, architect; Lung cancer.

June
June 9 – Kathlen Romeu, 24, a pregnant influence on Instagram; shot

July
July 27 – Orlando Drummond, 101, actor, voice actor and comedian (Escolinha do Professor Raimundo, Scooby-Doo); multiple organ failure

September
September 1 – José Gonçalves Heleno, 93, Roman Catholic prelate, coadjutor bishop (1976–1977) and bishop of Governador Valadares (1977–2001)
September 24 – Ota, 67, cartoonist.
September 26 – José Freire Falcão, 95, Roman Catholic cardinal, bishop of Limoeiro do Norte (1967–1971), archbishop of Teresina (1971–1984) and Brasília (1984–2004), COVID-19.

November
November 5 – Marília Mendonça, 26, singer and songwriter, Grammy winner (2019), airplane crash.

See also

COVID-19 pandemic in South America
Mercosur
Organization of American States
Organization of Ibero-American States
Community of Portuguese Language Countries

References

External links
Lula is back, and Brazil is facing a perfect storm (by Raphael Tsavkko Garcia, Al Jazeera, 25 March 2021)

 		

 
Years of the 21st century in Brazil
Brazil
Brazil
2020s in Brazil